Chatham & Clarendon Grammar School is a co-educational grammar school in Ramsgate, Kent, England, formed as a result of the merger of the boys-only Chatham House Grammar School and girls-only Clarendon House Grammar School in September 2011.

Chatham and Clarendon Grammar School is based across three main sites. The Chatham House site is where Year 7, 8 and 9 students are based, whereas Year 10 and 11 are based at the Clarendon House site. The Sixth Form Centre is where the Sixth Form students are based, but regularly have lessons across all three sites.

History
Chatham House was officially founded in 1797 by Dr William Humble along Chatham Street, although there is some evidence of existence prior to its formal establishment. Clarendon House was founded in 1905 on the first floor of the old police station.

Merger
The two Ramsgate schools, Clarendon House and Chatham House, had often partnered with each other for activities such as instrumental bands, choirs, an annual theatre production and field trips. Both were single sex until fifth form then allowed both boys and girls to enter in the sixth form. In the sixthform the two schools, actually within ten minutes' walk of each other, some AS and A level subjects were taught jointly by both schools, such as Music and Music Technology; or by one school. Drama that was taught at Clarendon but available to Chatham House students, while Sport Science was taught at Chatham House, but available to Clarendon House students. Clarendon House, however, was under-subscribed: Chatham House being over-subscribed.

The two schools federated in January 2011 to become a Converter Academy. bringing greater control over admissions, site & buildings, curriculum development and much-needed additional income.  Then, in spring 2011, it was announced that the schools would work together as one school. Year 7, 8 and 9 pupils would be based at Chatham House and year 10 and 11 pupils would be based at the former Clarendon House. The sixth-form centre would be based on both sites with all lessons being split between them. In this intermediate stage, Year 9 was moved to the lower school while the decisions about the sites were being taken.

Academics 
Virtually all maintained schools and academies follow the National Curriculum, and are inspected by Ofsted on how well they succeed in delivering a 'broad and balanced curriculum'. Schools endeavour to get all students to achieve the English Baccalaureate (EBACC) qualification- this must include core subjects, a modern or ancient foreign language, and either History or Geography. Schools are obliged to publish the philosophy governing their curriculum on their website.

Key Stage 3 (Years 7-9)
Key stage 3 is taught on the Chatham House site. 

Within KS3, all students study in single sex classes with some ability setting in Mathematics and within the Year 9 Science syllabus.

All students study English, Mathematics, Science, Design & Food Technology, Geography, History, Art, Computer Science, Physical Education & Games, Religion and Philosophy, Music, Drama and PSHE. In Year 7 all students study French, and students in Year 8 and 9 study French and Spanish.

Key Stage 4 GCSE (Years 10-11) 
This schools offers a variety of GCSE-Level qualifications. All students take core subjects, whilst also selecting others from their preference with the requirement of taking at least one language and one humanity.

Core Subjects

Option Subjects 

All students by default will take the Higher Tier option of their GCSE course, if applicable, but for struggling students the Foundation Tier option is made available to them.

When Students select their option subjects, they have four options (Language Option, Option 1, Option 2, and Option 3). The language option must be either French or Spanish, and there must be a humanity subject in Options 1 - 3 (Geography, History, or Religious Studies). Students are also able to take both French and Spanish if they wish, by indicating so in the Language Option and in one of Options 1 - 3.

Key Stage 5 (Years 12-13) 
The Sixth Form at this school offers a considerably large range of subjects, with 25 A-Level courses and 6 Vocational courses. Sixth Form students generally tend to study three courses, however do have the option to take more.

Entry Requirements 
In order for a student to study three or four Advanced Level subjects, they must achieve at least 5x Grade 6s at GCSE. In order for a student to study a double Level 3 Vocational course, and one or two Advanced Levels, they must achieve at least 3x Grade 5s and 2x Grade 6s a GCSE. Where relevant, a student will need a Grade 6 in a subject to study the same subject at the Sixth Form. Students are expected to continue their chosen subjects until the end of Year 13.

There are special rules or exceptions for subject options for students. It is not possible to study (Biology or Chemistry or Physics) and Applied Science. Students must achieve a Grade 7 in Mathematics at GCSE to study it at Advanced Level, and a Grade 8 in Mathematics at GCSE to study Further Mathematics at Advanced Level.

Students studying Further Mathematics will normally undertake the Mathematics Advanced Level exams at the end of Year 12.

House System
As the two schools became one, the house systems needed to change as Clarendon House had four houses for the entire school with Chatham having four different houses in the lower and upper school.

As a result of student voting, from September 2011, the new houses consisted of Thomas-Sharman (TS), Rothschild-Pearce (RP), Mann-Somerville (MS) and Knight-Heath (KH), double-barrelled amalgamations of old Chatham and Clarendon house names. It was announced that the new house colours would be Red, Silver, Gold and Blue.

House Competitions

There is an annual House Competition within the school as the four different houses compete in competitions to increase their total score. The house with the greatest score at the end of each academic year is the winning house.

Note: KH - Knight-Health, MS - Mann-Sommerville, RP - Rothschild-Pearce, TS - Thomas-Sharman

Awards System 
In both Schools, as a form of award, teachers may give out rewards known as Achievement Points or Commendations. Depending on the amount which a pupil has, there are various certificates which are given, and also a prize in the form of a pin badge, which students can wear on their uniform. Below are the awards which pupils may receive, and the higher the commendations needed, usually the harder it is to obtain the specific certificate.

Note that some houses repeat the commendation certificates for a second, third or possibly fourth round if pupils gain 100 commendations - which warrants a Red Certificate No. 2. However, not all houses do this and some just keep to the standard seven certificates.

Notable alumni
Alumni of Chatham House are known as Old Ruymians.
 Iain Aitch - author and journalist
 Herbert William Allingham, surgeon to the Household of King Edward VII, and surgeon in ordinary to the Prince of Wales (later King George V)
 Allan Butler, Ambassador to Mongolia from 1984 to 1987
 Matt Corker - professional rugby union player for the London Wasps
 Maj-Gen Patrick Crawford GM, Commandant from 1989 to 1993 of the Royal Army Medical College
 Jamie Davies - racing driver
 Matt Dunn - romantic comedy novelist
 Marc Gascoigne - fantasy writer
 Prof Peter Gregory (academic), Director since 2005 of the Scottish Crop Research Institute at Invergowrie near Dundee, and Professor of Soil Science from 1994–2005 at the University of Reading
 Geoffrey Colin Guy CMG CVO OBE, Governor of Saint Helena from 1976 to 1981, and Commissioner of the Turks and Caicos Islands from 1958 to 1959 and 1959–1965

 Sir Edward Heath - Prime Minister of the United Kingdom from 1970 to 1974
 Stewart Jackson - Conservative MP for Peterborough from 2005 to 2017
 Sean Kerly - Olympic field hockey player
 Lieutenant Marc Lawrence, Sea King observer of 849 Naval Air Squadron, killed on 21 March 2003 in a crash in Kuwait
 Ali Marchant, radio DJ
 John Marek Labour MP for Wrexham from 1983–2001
 Frank Muir - humourist
 Rev Dr Edward Norman, gave the BBC Reith Lecture in 1978
 John Ovenden, Labour MP for Gravesend from 1974 to 1979 and Leader of Kent County Council from 1994 to 1997
 Geoff Parsons - Olympic high jumper
 Charles Robson (1859–1943), Middlesex and Hampshire wicket-keeper, and secretary (manager) of Southampton Football Club
 Prof Robert Tavernor, emeritus professor of architecture and urban design at the London School of Economics (LSE)
 Air Chief Marshal Sir Peter Terry, station commander from 1968 to 1970 of RAF El Adem (in Libya), Governor of Gibraltar from 1985 to 1989, and targeted by the IRA on 18 September 1990 which severely injured him
 Air Vice-Marshal Henry Thornton CBE
 Nik Turner - founder of the space rock band Hawkwind
 Most Rev Gregory James Venables, Archbishop of South America since 2001
 Air Chief Marshal Sir Bill Wratten CBE CB - Air Officer Commanding-in-Chief of RAF Strike Command during the first Gulf War, station commander from 1980 to 1982 of RAF Coningsby

References

External links 
 Chatham & Clarendon Grammar School Home Page

Grammar schools in Kent
Ramsgate
1797 establishments in England
Educational institutions established in 1797
Grade II listed educational buildings
Grade II listed buildings in Kent
Academies in Kent